The 1961 California Golden Bears football team was an American football team that represented the University of California, Berkeley in the Athletic Association of Western Universities (AAWU) during the 1961 NCAA University Division football season. In its second year under head coach Marv Levy, the team compiled a 1–8–1 record (1–3 against AAWU opponents), finished in last place in the AAWU, and was outscored by its opponents by a combined total of 268 to 118.

The team's statistical leaders included Randy Gold with 403 passing yards, Alan Nelson with 331 rushing yards, and Bob Wills with 302 receiving yards.

Schedule

Personnel

References

California
California Golden Bears football seasons
California Golden Bears football